Smetanova Lhota is a municipality and village in Písek District in the South Bohemian Region of the Czech Republic. It has about 300 inhabitants.

Administrative parts
Villages of Karlov and Vrábsko are administrative parts of Smetanova Lhota.

Notable people
Jan Koller (born 1973), footballer; lives here

References

External links

Villages in Písek District